Cornfield is a surname. Notable people with the surname include: 

Charlotte Cornfield (born 1988 or 1989), Canadian singer-songwriter
Hubert Cornfield (1929–2006), American film director
Jerome Cornfield (1912–1979), American statistician
John Cornfield (born 1958), British record producer and sound engineer
Jordan Cornfield (born 1982), Canadian lacrosse player

See also
Cornfeld
Kornfield
Kornfeld